The Lower Lusatian Heath Nature Park is a nature park and reserve in the state of Brandenburg, Germany. It covers an area of 490 km2 (189 sq mi). It was established on May 24, 1996.

In the south, where Brandenburg's oldest landscape is found, the area was formed approximately 180,000 years ago at the end of the ice age, with its glacial valley. Among the ice-age deposits are massive coal layers. After extensive mining in the last hundred years, the landscapes has developed a unique and in some parts, a bizarre appearance. In many places are valuable specialized habitats for animals and plants.

Nature parks in Brandenburg
Protected areas established in 1996